Rao Bahadur Sajjan Rao (1868–1942) was a businessman and philanthropist from Bengaluru who was well known for his charities, educational institutions, hospitals, and hostels for the underprivileged.

Early life
Sajjan Rao was born in Taggalla, Maddur in 1868 to a poor family. He traveled from Maddur to Bengaluru to work with his maternal uncle Bojagade Venkataraya and became one of the richest man in Bengaluru by 1926.

Notable works
 He built Subramanya Swamy temple, choultry at Sajjan Rao Circle.
 The maternity block at Vanivilas Women and Children Hospital in Bengaluru is named after him as a token of gratitude for his 50,000 rupees donation in 1930 which was demanded by Diwan Sir Mirza Ismail.
 He built roundabout at Sajjan Rao circle on the demand by the corporation to facilitate hassle free traffic movement.
 He has also constructed a dispensary at  Sajjan Rao circle which he donated to the corporation in 1909.
 In 1909, he built a free hostel dedicated to his maternal uncle Venkat Rao Bhojagade which is called as Maratha hostel at present.
 He has also constructed educational institution for the poor students as well as the school for differently abled.

Recognition
 He was awarded with the title Dharma Prakasha by King of Mysore in recognition of his social work .
The circle near Lalbagh is named after him as Sajjan Rao Circle.
 Also, the road in V V Puram is named after him as Sajjan Rao road.

Death 
Sajjan Rao died in 1942. He is buried near the Gavi Gangadhareshwara Temple in Gavipuram.

References

Indian philanthropists
People from Bangalore
1868 births
1942 deaths
People from Bangalore Urban district